Provincial elections were held in Spanish Guinea in May 1964 to elect the Provincial Councils of the provinces of Fernando Pó and Río Muni.

Background
Spanish Guinea had been granted autonomy from 1 January 1964 by the Spanish government. A Government Council and General Assembly were created, whilst the two Provincial Assemblies remained.

Results
The National Unity Movement of Equatorial Guinea (MUNGE) emerged as the largest party, and its leader Bonifacio Ondó Edu was appointed President of the Government Council.

References

Spanish Guinea
1964 in Spanish Guinea
Elections in Equatorial Guinea
Spanish Guinea